The Bridgewater State Bears are composed of 22 varsity teams representing Bridgewater State University in intercollegiate athletics. All teams compete at the NCAA Division III level and all teams compete in the Massachusetts State Collegiate Athletic Conference (MASCAC), except for field hockey, tennis and swimming & diving which plays in the Little East Conference (LEC).

Background 
The intercollegiate athletic program offers 22 varsity teams, including Basketball, Cross Country, Soccer, Swimming and diving, Tennis, Track and field, Baseball, Football, and Wrestling for men. As for the women's sports teams they include Basketball, Cross Country, Equestrian, Soccer, Swimming and diving, Tennis, Track and field, Field hockey, Lacrosse, Softball, and Volleyball.

Nickname 
Bridgewater State adopted its mascot the bear in the 1960s and was decided by a student vote when Bridgewater State brought modern day football to the college. Bridgewater State's mascot is Bristaco the Bear which is named after the former college title. BRIdgewater STAte COllege - BRISTACO Bear. The school colors are crimson, white, and black.

Sports Sponsored 
Not only does Bridgewater State University offer intercollegiate athletics, but they also provide Intramural athletic programs, and Club sports program. Such as Cheerleading, several dance teams, Men's Lacrosse, Men's Rugby, Ultimate Frisbee, Soccer, Basketball, etc. BSU recently renovated the Swanson football field and resurfaced the track.

Bridgewater State University athletic performance has gradually improved over the years. The bears won the Smith Trophy for the best overall Athletic Department in the Massachusetts State College Athletic Conference.

In addition to NCAA-sanctioned varsity sports, Bridgewater State supports 10 club sports through Campus Recreation, including cheerleading, dance team, equestrian, hip-hop team, ice hockey, men's lacrosse, outdoor adventure, ultimate frisbee, skiing, and Men's rugby.

Varsity Teams

Club Sports

Men's Ice Hockey
Women's Ice Hockey
Men's Lacrosse
Men's Rugby 
Women's Rugby
Coed Cheerleading
Coed Dance
Coed Golf
Coed Gymnastics
Coed Hip Hop dance
Coed Ultimate

Swimming and Diving 
The Bridgewater State Swimming and Diving team is successful. They swim Co-Ed, however compete separately. They are part of the NEISDA division and will celebrate 50 years as a program in the Fall of 2020. Alumnus Michael Caruso is the head coach. Bridgewater State has a rich history of All-Americans and National Championship qualifiers. Ten elite swimmers will compete to qualify for the NCAA-D3 championships.

Football 

The Bridgewater State football team has been one of the most successful athletic teams at the school since the program was started in 1960. Bridgewater State is a member of the MASCAC, which will sponsor football for the first time in its history beginning in 2013. Bridgewater State was formerly a founding member of the New England Football Conference from 1965 to 2012. The new MASCAC football conference will consist of nine schools. These member schools are Bridgewater State University, Fitchburg State University, Framingham State University, Massachusetts Maritime Academy, Westfield State University, Worcester State University, Plymouth State University, UMass-Dartmouth, and Western Connecticut State University. Bridgewater State will begin MASCAC play in 2013.

Head coach Chuck Denune recently completed his 11th season at the helm in 2015. In 2012, the Bears ended the regular season with a 9–1 record and qualified for the NCAA Division III National Tournament with an at-large bid for the third time in the program's history. Bridgewater State also qualified for the NCAA Division III National Tournament in 1999 and 2000. The Bears lost in the first round of the 2012 NCAA Division III Tournament to Widener University of West Chester, Pennsylvania by a score of 44–14. The Bears football team finished the 2012 season with a 9–2 overall record and finished in 2nd place in the New England Football Conference standings. Bridgewater also hosted the 2011 (ECAC) Eastern College Athletic Conference Northeast Bowl and competed against Alfred University. Unfortunately, the Bears lost 41–10, and finished the 2011 season with a 7–4 record.

The most successful head football coach in Bridgewater State's history is Peter Mazzaferro. Coach Mazzaferro was the head football coach at Bridgewater from 1968 to 2004 (36 years) and is one of the most successful Division III football coaches in history. During his coaching tenure, he led the Bears to 2 NCAA D-III National Tournament appearances, 8 NEFC League Championships, 3 MASCAC Championships, and 2 ECAC Postseason appearances. With an overall coaching record of 209–157–11, Mazzaferro is the 57th winningest coach in NCAA College Football history, and he is regarded as a coaching legend in the New England region and is further regarded as one of the greatest Division III college football coaches of all time.

Listed below are notable awards, accolades, and accomplishments the BSU football team have accumulated since the inception of the program in 1960. The Bears football team have only had two losing seasons since 1985 and have had seven undefeated or 1-loss seasons in that same timeframe.

 NCAA Division III National Tournament Qualifier - 1999, 2000, 2012, 2016
 ECAC Postseason Qualifier - 1989, 1992, 2005, 2006, 2007, 2010, 2011, 2015
 ECAC Northeast Bowl Champions - 2005
 ECAC North Atlantic Bowl Champions - 2006
 NEFC League Champions - 1966, 1969, 1989, 1992, 1997, 1998, 1999, 2000
 MASCAC League Champions - 2016

Women's basketball 
The Women's basketball team has been a regional power since its debut in 1982. Coach Bridgett Casey coached her 14th season at BSU. In 2007–2008, Bridgett guided the Bears to a 22–5 (.815) record and the program's first appearance in the NCAA Division III Tournament since 1986. The woman's basketball team competes in the (ECAC) Eastern College Athletic Conference and the (MASCAC) Massachusetts State College Athletic Conference. The Lady Bears' basketball team has qualified for the NCAA D-3 Tournament every year since 2010, and are constantly a contender for the MASCAC Championship.

Accomplishments

 MASCAC Champions - 1984–1985, 1985–1986, 2007–2008, 2009–2010, 2011–2012, 2012–2013
 ECAC Playoff Qualifier - 1987–1988, 2005–2006
 NCAA D-III Qualifier - 1982–1983, 1983–1984, 1984–1985, 1985–1986, 1986–1987, 2007–2008, 2010–2011, 2011–2012, 2012–2013

Men's basketball 
Joe Farroba is the head coach of the Bridgewater State Men's basketball team. "Joe came to Bridgewater State and to the MASCAC as an assistant coach under former BSC Head Coach Mark Champagne in 1986." Coach Farroba has led the Bears to postseason play eight times, including the NCAA Division III Tournament in 1999, 2006, 2009, 2010 and 2011 (led by Maxwell Dolgin, Center). In 2009 after recording a school record in wins the team received a national ranking for the first time in schools history. That team featured 3 1000 point scorers. The Men's basketball team also participates in the (MASCAC) Massachusetts State College Athletic Conference, and the NCAA Division III tournament. The Bears basketball team has been one of the most successful teams at Bridgewater in the last 30 years. They have won numerous league and conference championships and made several appearances in the NCAA D-3 National Tournament. They finished under .500 for the first time in ten years in 2012–2013.

Accomplishments

 MASCAC Champions - 2008–2009, 2009–2010, 2017–2018
 ECAC Playoff Qualifier - 1995–1996, 1996–1997, 1997, 1998
 NCAA D-III Qualifier - 1982–1983, 1998–1999, 2005–2006, 2008–2009, 2009–2010, 2010–2011, 2017–2018
 NCAA D-III Sweet Sixteen - 2008-2009

Women's lacrosse 
The Lady Bears' Lacrosse team has statistically been the most successful athletic team in Bridgewater State's history. They have been a dominant woman's lacrosse team in the Northeast Region and have won dozens of championships and qualified for numerous NCAA Tournaments. The Lady Bears won the NEWLA regular season and tournament titles for the 7th straight season and advanced to the NCAA Division III Tournament in 2013.

Accomplishments

 NEWLA Champions - 1999, 2003, 2008, 2009, 2010, 2011, 2012
 ECAC Playoff Qualifier - 1986, 1987, 2000, 2002, 2007, 2008
 MASCAC Champions - 2013, 2014, 2015
 NCAA D-III Qualifier - 2003, 2010, 2011, 2012, 2013, 2014, 2015

Baseball 
The Bridgewater State baseball team has been a dominant force in the New England region for decades. They have made dozens of postseason appearances and won several league and regional championships. Bridgewater State has one of the highest all-time winning percentages (.645) in the country. They have made it to the NCAA D-III World Series 3 times, and have placed in the Elite Eight twice there. They have also produced a handful of Division 3 All-Americans and All-Region players. Below is a list of accomplishments and accolades.

Accomplishments

 MASCAC Champions - 1988, 1989, 1990, 1991, 1992, 1993, 1996, 1997, 1998, 2001, 2003, 2004, 2005, 2006, 2012
 ECAC Playoff Qualifier - 1987, 1988, 1993, 1994, 2005
 ECAC Playoff Champions - 1986
 NCAA D-III Qualifier - 1989, 1990, 1991, 1992, 1996, 1997, 2011, 2012
 NCAA D-III New England Regional Qualifier - 1996, 1997, 1998, 1999, 2000, 2001, 2003, 2004, 2011, 2012
 NCAA D-III New England Regional Champions - 1996
 NCAA D-III Mid-Atlantic Regional Champions - 1997
 NCAA D-III World Series - 1996 (3rd Place), 1997 (7th Place)

Cross Country (Men's) 
Men's Cross Country in recent years has slowly been building up the program that is now lead by Connor Foley. The Men have won this years (2019) Mascac Title after a drought of 6 years.

Accomplishments

 MASCAC Champions - 1997, 1998, 2000, 2001, 2010, 2012, 2019
 MASCAC Runner Up- 2017,2018

Cross Country (Women's) 
The women's Cross Country team in recent years has lacked squad depth but for the most recent season have gained a lot. The team is also lead by Connor Foley.

Accomplishments

 MASCAC Champions - 2001, 2002, 2003

References 

Bridgewater State Bears